Aluva KSRTC bus station is a transport hub in the Indian city of Aluva, owned and operated by the Kerala State Road Transport Corporation (KSRTC). An important transport hub in the state, the station is located left aside Aluva railway station, one of the busiest railway stations in the Ernakulam district, and a kilometre away from Aluva metro station of Kochi Metro.

Overview
A prominent transport hub in the state, around 30000 people use the bus services from the station. Passengers travelling to Munnar high range rely heavily on the Aluva bus station making it one of the busiest stations in central Kerala.

Renovation
In 2019, the authorities announced a ₹ 6 crore renovation project for the construction of a new bus terminal and passenger amenity center by demolitioning the old terminal block. As of October 2021, a new two-storey building with a total area of 30,155 square feet is currently under construction. On the ground floor, there is a ticket counter, a station office, a police aid post, six stalls, a 170-seat waiting area, a canteen and a waiting room for men and women. The first floor will be having five office rooms and a 43-seat waiting area. 55 shops will be also provided for commercial activities. The station will have parking facilities for 30 buses and can normally handle 20 buses at a time. In addition, there will be parking facilities for 110 two-wheelers and 110 cars.

References

Bus stations in Kerala
Buildings and structures in Ernakulam district
Aluva
Transport in Ernakulam district